Fehmi Agani (23 January 1932 – 6 May 1999) was a sociologist and politician in Kosovo who was considered to be the leading thinker and political strategist of the Democratic League of Kosovo (LDK) in the 1990s. He represented the LDK in international negotiations prior to the 1998–1999 Kosovo War, but was murdered, apparently by Serbian soldiers,during the war because his political attitudes.

Early life and educational career
Agani was born in Gjakova in the then Kingdom of Yugoslavia and was educated at a Pristina school. He studied at the University of Belgrade's Faculty of Arts, graduating in 1959 and completing a master's degree in political science in 1964. He subsequently taught sociology in Pristina, obtained a doctorate and took up a teaching position at the University of Pristina. He served as director of the Albanological Institute between 1967 and 1970, and as dean of the Faculty of Philosophy between 1978 and 1980. The authorities excluded him from teaching in 1981 and expelled him from the university during a purge of Kosovo Albanian academics following student riots.

Political career
Agani was elected as a corresponding member of the Academy of Sciences and Arts of Kosovo in 1994 and became a full member two years later. He participated in the political dialogue over Kosovo's future, serving under Ibrahim Rugova as a co-founder and deputy head of the Democratic League of Kosovo (LDK). He became the LDK's leading thinker and political strategist. He headed Albanian delegations at talks leading up to the 1998–1999 Kosovo War and was one of the principal Kosovar negotiators at the Rambouillet Conference. A leading advocate of non-violence and reconciliation, he founded the Forum for Ethnic Relations with the aim of fostering a dialogue between Albanians and Serbs. The Kosovo Albanian philosopher Shkëlzen Maliqi later described Agani's role as being

Kosovo War and death
He remained in Kosovo during the war and escaped an initial purge of prominent Kosovo Albanians from Pristina carried out by Serbian forces. NATO mistakenly announced his death a few days after the NATO bombing of Yugoslavia began, but he stayed in hiding in safe houses in the city for five weeks, using the time to start writing a book. He attempted to escape to Macedonia by train, but it was turned back at the border. As the train set off back to Pristina, Agani was removed from his carriage by the police. His body was found near the village of Lipjan several days later. Although the Serbian media blamed his death on the Kosovo Liberation Army (KLA), the killing was attributed by his family, the KLA, and Western politicians to Yugoslavia's security forces. The Federal Foreign Office of Germany released a statement, where they said that the case of Agani would be solved by the ICTY, but to date nobody has been charged with Agani's murder.

Bibliography
 Në rrjedha të mendimit sociologjik – Vepra I 1990.  and 
 Për shoqërinë civile – Vepra II  and 
 Demokracia, Kombi, Vetëvendosja – Vepra III  and 
 Partitë dhe grupet politike në Shqipëri gajtë luftës së dytë botërore (1939–1945) – Vepra IV  and 
 Sindikatat Gjermane dhe shkrime tjera – Vepra V  and 
 Gjuha e dhunës dhe zëri i arsyes – Vepra VI  and 

See also
Agim Hajrizi
List of solved missing person cases
List of unsolved murders
Ukshin Hoti

References

1932 births
1990s missing person cases
1999 deaths
Albanologists
Formerly missing people
Kosovo Albanians
Male murder victims
Missing person cases in Europe
People killed in the Kosovo War
University of Belgrade alumni
Academic staff of the University of Pristina
Unsolved murders in Europe
Writers from Gjakova
Yugoslav people of Albanian descent
Yugoslav writers
Members of the Academy of Sciences and Arts of Kosovo